The Search for Kennedy's PT 109 is a National Geographic television special and video on DVD, directed by Peter Getzels. It documents the true story of John F. Kennedy's PT-109 from World War II, and the successful search for the ship by Dr. Robert Ballard.

Details 
The wreckage of PT-109 was located in May 2002, when a National Geographic Society expedition, headed by Ballard, found a torpedo tube amongst wreckage that matched the description, and location, of Kennedy's vessel in the Solomon Islands. The boat was identified by Dale Ridder, a weapons and explosives expert on the U.S. Marine Forensics Panel. The forward section was later found using remote-viewing equipment, however, the stern was never discovered. Much of the half-buried wreckage and grave site was left undisturbed in accordance with Navy policy.

During the expedition, they meet and interview Biuku Gasa and Eroni Kumana, the original two natives who were dispatched by coastwatcher Reg Evans to find Kennedy's shipwrecked crew after the Navy had given them up for dead. Max Kennedy, Kennedy's nephew, who joined Ballard on the expedition, presented a bust of Kennedy to the two men.

Media 
A DVD of the National Geographic television special and book of the expedition were later released.

See also
Cultural depictions of John F. Kennedy

References

2002 television films
2002 films
Seafaring films based on actual events
Films about the United States Navy in World War II
Documentary films about John F. Kennedy
Documentary films about United States history
National Geographic Society films
Documentary films about World War II
2000s American films